Baird's sandpiper (Calidris bairdii) is a small shorebird. It is among those calidrids which were formerly included in the genus Erolia, which was subsumed into the genus Calidris in 1973. The genus name is from Ancient Greek kalidris or skalidris, a term used by Aristotle for some grey-coloured waterside birds. The English name and specific bairdii commemorate Spencer Fullerton Baird, 19th-century naturalist and assistant secretary of the Smithsonian Institution.

Description
Adults have black legs and a short, straight, thin dark bill. They are dark brown on top and mainly white underneath with a black patch on the rump. The head and breast are light brown with dark streaks. In winter plumage, this species is paler brownish gray above. This bird can be difficult to distinguish from other similar tiny shorebirds; these are known collectively as "peeps" or "stints".

One of the best identification features is the long wings, which extend beyond the tail when the bird is on the ground. Only the white-rumped sandpiper also shows this, and that bird can be distinguished by its namesake feature.

Ecology

Baird's sandpipers breed in the northern tundra from eastern Siberia to western Greenland. They nest on the ground, usually in dry locations with low vegetation.

They are a long-distance migrant, wintering in South America. This species is a rare vagrant to western Europe.

Baird's sandpiper might have hybridized with the buff-breasted sandpiper.

These birds forage by moving about mudflats, picking up food by sight. They mainly eat insects, also some small crustaceans.

References

External links

 North American Peeps: A Different Look at an Old Problem (identification article covering this species and other small calidrids) at surfbirds.com
 
 
 Baird's Sandpiper Species Account – Cornell Lab of Ornithology
 
 
 
 
 
 

Birds of the Arctic
Calidris
Erolia
Sandpipers
Native birds of Alaska
Birds of Canada
Birds described in 1861
Taxa named by Elliott Coues